Aleksandra Nikiforova (born Alexandra Olegovna Nikiforova 16 February 1993) is a Russian actress, best known for her role in a Turkish TV series Kalbimin Sultanı as a Russian "spy on the Sultan's Harem", and (Detective Anna) and Commander's Bride.

Personal life 
Alexandra Nikiforova was born on February 16, 1993, in Sevastopol, Crimea. She was a student of St. Petersburg University. She started her career as an actress in 2016. According to Alexandra, it was that period that determined her future fate.

Education 
While studying in the 11th grade, she received an invitation from the University of St. Petersburg to participate in the contest "Mind + beauty = student", which guaranteed the winner admission to the University without test and tution fee. But a year later she transferred to the Faculty of Linguistics. However, later she admitted to the Russian State Institute of Performing Arts. But she did not graduate from this university, because in the third year, she gave birth to a daughter and took a sabbatical.

Marriage 
Alexandra married Evgeny Semenov, who was the director of the film "Detective Anna", which brought her an international attention. Later, they separated from each other shortly after the birth of their daughter Anna. Evgeny accused Alexandra of allegedly starring in pornographic films, which she herself told him.

Career

Early work (2008–2015)
Nikiforova committed to acting professionally at the age of 23, but initially found it easier to pass auditions. From childhood, she was familiar with the acting profession. Her own aunt was a member of the "Black Sea Fleet Theater troupe". Alexandra was often invited to performances, escorted backstage and shown all the secrets of acting. Her first appearance in cinema was the children's adventure film "Трое с площади Карронад"", in which Alexandra played the role of schoolgirl Lyuda Sviridova. 
In 2008-2010, at the age of 15, Alexandra worked in the Sevastopol Youth Theatre, played many significant roles including military roles, in "On an Island, Among the Raging Elements" and "War Has No Female Face".  She was invited to perform as an regular actress of the Psycho Del Art Theater (Sevastopol), and worked in "Messalina - the Emperor's Wife" (Messalina) and "Donka" (Michelle) from 2009-2010.

Breakthrough (2016) 
Nikiforova's first breakthrough came when she played leading role Anna in "Detective Anna", after she moved to Moscow,  transferring to the Shchepkin Theater School. Before that, she jus had experience working in theater, and mini-series such as "The Three at the Square of Carronades". Although she played as supporting character in the films "Russian Character", "Wound Leave", "City Spies", "Leningrad 46" and others. 
Alexandra worked together with Andrei Ilyin and Svetlana Nemolyaeva. In 2018, a drama "Idol" released, where she played a Soviet model. In the same year, the popular detective series "Ragged Melody" was released, in which she played with the Serbian Mir Marić.

International work (2019) 
Although widely praised for her acting and performances, Alexandra had rarely found films or series' that appealed to a wide audience, but another breakthrough came when she was invited to play the leading role of Anna Petrona in 2019's Turkish-Russian historical TV series Kalbimin Sultanı, made her an international superstar.

Plot 
The series tells about Istanbul of the 19th century. The love story of the daughter of an official from the Russian Embassy "Anna Petrona" and the great Ottoman Sultan "Mehmud Han" makes thousands of viewers cling to TV screens. In this, Nikiforova was a Russian teacher of language. One day, the powerful Sultan Mahmud II took to the streets in the guise of a boatman. Suddenly some Jenisseri started rampant in the locality. Seeing this, the Sultan fought with them in the guise of a boatman. When the Sultan came to the river bank, Anna met him. Anna asked him to ride the boat to cross the river. Sultan found Anna a language teacher. Next day he invited her to the imperial Harem to teach the heirs of the ruling dynasty French and Russian language. Anna became fool seeing the Sultan, and tried to refuse. But the envoy of the Russian Empire, Dmitry Shcherbina threatened Anna with the death of her father, he forces her to settle in the sultan's palace as a spy. But both of them fall in love. 

She had to learn Turkish for this widely liked series. The second season of the project is expected in the spring of 2022.

TV show 
In 2018, the actress got a minor role in the series "Secrets of Mrs. Kirsanova".  Later, Nikiforova became the host in the TV show "Signs of Fate". The program told about ambiguous and mysterious events that affected the lives of ordinary people and celebrities.

Filmography

Television

Theatrical works
Her theatrical works as below:

Prizes and awards
2017 Seoul International Drama Awards in the field of television production nominated her as the Best Dramatic Actress, Performer of the main role for the drama series "Detective Anna".

References

External links 
 

Living people
1993 births
Russian actresses